Osmar Núñez (born 15 September 1957) is an Argentine film and theatre actor.

Filmography
 El Milagro secreto (1998)
 Los Senderos (1999)
 Con palos y piedras (2000)
 Vivir Intentando (2003)
 Informe nocturno (2004)
 Un Año sin amor (2005)  A Year Without Love
 Mientras tanto (2006)
 El Custodio (2006) a.k.a. The Minder
 El Cielo elegido (2006)
 Las Vidas posibles (2006)
 Encarnación (2007)
 El nido vacío (2008)
 The Invisible Eye (2010)
 It's Your Fault (2010)
 Brother and Sister (2010)
 Contra las Cuerdas (2010)
 The Corporation (2012)
 Wild Tales (2014)
 Betibú (2014)

Awards
 Silver Condor Award for Best Actor (2015)

References

External links
 
 

Living people
1957 births
Argentine male film actors
Argentine male stage actors